The Latvian Museum of Architecture is a museum in Riga, Latvia. It is housed in an old medieval building in Old Riga and belongs to the Latvian Museum Association.

External links
Official site

Museums in Riga
Architecture museums